The 1967–68 Yugoslav First Basketball League season was the 24th season of the Yugoslav First Basketball League. The season ended with KK Zadar winning the league championship, ahead of KK Olimpija.

The season represents a milestone in the history of basketball in Yugoslavia as the beginning of a new era that saw the sport being played entirely indoors on hardwood floor surfaces as opposed to outdoors on a variety of surfaces as had been the practice previously. The change enabled the league to switch to a seasonal schedule that begins during autumn and ends in spring as opposed to the previous practice of playing within the same calendar year, usually between April and October.

Since most Yugoslav teams didn't yet possess basketball-specific indoor facilities of their own, they had to make do with hosting their home games in community-owned makeshift venues or in case of three clubs – playing outside of their city.

The four Belgrade clubs – Red Star, Partizan, OKK, and Radnički – played their home games at the various Belgrade Fair halls (including the biggest one: Hall 1), Zagreb's Lokomotiva played at the Zagreb Police's Fire Hall, while certain clubs had to play in entirely different cities: defending champion KK Zadar played most of its home games of the season in Split, Čačak's Borac played their home games in Zrenjanin, and Sarajevo's newly promoted Mlada Bosna played in Zenica.

Notable events

Opening day
The season began on Saturday, 11 November 1967 – only six days after the previous season ended on 5 November 1967 – with the opening game in Ljubljana's Topniška Street Hall pitting the home team KD Slovan versus the visiting Red Star Belgrade. Despite being the underdogs, the home team won 79–78.

Classification

Results 

Source:

The winning roster of Zadar:
  Miljenko Valčić
  Đuro Stipčević
  Milan Komazec
  
  Mile Marcelić
  Josip Đerđa
  Krešimir Ćosić
  Ratko Laura
  Petar Anić
  Jure Košta
  Goran Brajković
  Petar Jelić
  Željko Troskot
  Nikola Olujić

Coach:  Đorđo Zdrilić

Qualification in 1968–69 season European competitions 

FIBA European Champions Cup
 Zadar (champions)

FIBA Cup Winner's Cup
 Olimpija (2nd)

References

Yugoslav First Basketball League seasons
Yugo
Yugo